Guy A. Carbone is an American attorney and Perennial candidate in Massachusetts who was  Metropolitan District Commissioner from 1979–1980.

Electoral history

Other races
Massachusetts gubernatorial election, 1982 – Dropped out to run for Northern District District Attorney.
Massachusetts gubernatorial election, 1986 – Did not receive enough votes at the Republican convention.
Massachusetts gubernatorial election, 1990 – Dropped out to run for Massachusetts Attorney General.

References

Massachusetts Republicans
Massachusetts Democrats
People from Watertown, Massachusetts
People from Belmont, Massachusetts
Year of birth missing (living people)
Living people